Arkansas Highway 304 (AR 304, Hwy. 304) is an east–west state highway in Arkansas. The route of  runs from US Route 67 (US 67) (Future Interstate 57 {I-57}) and Highway 90 in south Pocahontas east to Highway 34/Highway 90 in Delaplaine.

Route description
Highway 304 begins at US 67 (Future I-57) south of Pocahontas. The route heads east past Nick Wilson Field and Black River Technical College to meet Highway 304N. Highway 304 has a junction with Highway 231 near Sharum before entering Greene County. Highway 304 continues east to Delaplaine, where it meets AR 34/AR 90 and terminates.

History
Highway 304 was added to the state highway system as part of a large transfer of county roads to the state system that took place on April 24, 1963. Initially only the portion from US 67 to the Greene County line was transferred to state maintenance.

Major intersections

Pocahontas northern route

The highway runs from US 167/Highway 90 south to Highway 304.

Major intersections

See also

 List of state highways in Arkansas

References

External links

304
Transportation in Greene County, Arkansas
Transportation in Randolph County, Arkansas